Triple Action Thunder is a Breech-loading, single shot handgun designed to fire the .50 BMG cartridge and developed by Triple Action LLC, an FFL based in Logan, Utah.

References

.50 caliber handguns
Single-shot pistols